The following is a list of the 23 cantons of the Côte-d'Or department, in France, following the French canton reorganisation which came into effect in March 2015:

 Arnay-le-Duc
 Auxonne
 Beaune
 Brazey-en-Plaine
 Châtillon-sur-Seine
 Chenôve
 Chevigny-Saint-Sauveur
 Dijon-1
 Dijon-2
 Dijon-3
 Dijon-4
 Dijon-5
 Dijon-6
 Fontaine-lès-Dijon
 Genlis
 Is-sur-Tille
 Ladoix-Serrigny
 Longvic
 Montbard
 Nuits-Saint-Georges
 Saint-Apollinaire
 Semur-en-Auxois
 Talant

References